The Ute Wars were a series of conflicts between the Ute people and the United States which began in 1849 and ended in 1923.

Wars
Jicarilla War (1849–1855)
Battle at Fort Utah (1850)
Walker War (1853–1854)
Tintic War (1856)
Black Hawk War (1865–1872)
White River War (1879)
Pinhook Draw fight (15-16 June 1881) 
Beaver Creek Massacre (June 19, 1885) – Cases of cattle-rustling by the Utes on white cattlemen caused tensions that eventually led to a skirmish between the two parties in Beaver Creek. In the gunfight that ensued, cowboys killed six Mountain Ute Indians. It was the last major confrontation between Ute Indians and white settlers in Colorado.
Ute War (1887)
Bluff War (1914–1915)
Bluff Skirmish (1921)
Posey War (1923)

See also
Battle Creek Massacre
Sioux Wars
Apache Wars
Navajo Wars
Comanche Wars

References

Bibliography
 

Ute
Ute
Ute
Ute
Ute
Mormonism and Native Americans